State Route 152 (SR 152) is a  east-west state highway traversing the flat farmland of West Tennessee.

Route description
SR 152 begins in Crockett County in Cairo at an interchange with US 412/SR 20, where the road continues west 1.75 miles as Reynolds Road to SR 189. Some maps erroneously label this as Nichols Road, even though this is incorrect. It goes east to have an intersection with SR 188 before leaving the community and continuing through rural areas, where it has an intersection with SR 54, before crossing into Gibson County. The highway crosses over the Middle Fork of the Forked Deer River to enter Humboldt along McLin Street to have an intersection with US 70A Bypass/US 79 Bypass/SR 366. It passes through neighborhoods as it turns south onto N 9th Avenue before turning east along Mitchell Street to have an intersection with US 45W Business/SR 5 (N Central Avenue). It continues east through neighborhoods to have an intersection with US 70A/US 79/SR 76 (Eastend Drive) before having an intersection with US 45W/SR 366. The highway now leaves Humboldt and passes through rural areas to have an intersection with SR 186 before entering Medina and having an intersection with US 45E/SR 43. SR 152 passes through downtown along W Church Avenue, then Main Street, and finally E Foster Avenue, before leaving Medina and continuing east through farmland to cross into Madison County. It turns southeast to cross the Middle Fork of the Forked Deer River, for a second time, to pass through Spring Creek, where it has a short 70 feet concurrency with US 70/SR 1, before turning completely south and having an interchange with I-40 (Exit 93). The highway then comes to an end shortly afterwards at an intersection with US 412/SR 20. The entire route of SR 152 is a two-lane highway.

Major intersections

References

152
Transportation in Crockett County, Tennessee
Transportation in Gibson County, Tennessee
Transportation in Madison County, Tennessee